Brian Barone is the head coach or the men's basketball team at Southern Illinois University Edwardsville (SIUE), an NCAA Division I program competing in the Ohio Valley Conference (OVC).

Coaching history
Barone began his coaching career as a junior college assistant at Central Florida Community College, then at  Garden City Community College in Kansas.

He began his Division I coaching career at Illinois State under head coach Porter Moser, currently the head men's basketball coach at Loyola University Chicago. After five  seasons at ISU, he became the coordinator of basketball operations and video coordinator at Marquette under head coach Tom Crean. He followed Crean to Indiana to serve as IU's director of basketball operations/video coordinator.

Barone returned to actual coaching as assistant to former Marquette teammate and current Bradley head coach Brian Wardle at Green Bay. Moving up to associate head coach, Barone was expected to succeed Wardel when he left Green Bay. It was a surprise to the college basketball community when Linc Darner was named to the post.

After not getting the Green Bay job, Barone was named the head coach at Butler Community College, replacing his Marquette teammate Mike Bargen.

Barone was out of coaching for most of the next two years. On June 6, 2017, he was named assistant to former Marquette teammate Jon Harris at SIU Edwardsville. On March 11, 2019, SIUE announced that coach Jon Harris' contract had not been renewed after a four-year record of 31 wins and 88 losses. However, in a highly unusual move, all of  Harris' staff of assistant coaches Brian Barone, Charles "Bubba" Wells, and Mike Waldo and Director of Operations Casey Wyllie was retained, and Barone was later initially named as interim head coach. The interim tag was removed when Barone was confirmed as head coach by the SIU board of trustees, and his contract was then extended through the 2023–24 season.

Personal
Barone was born December 15, 1977 in Chicago, Illinois shortly before his family moved to Peoria, Illinois where his father Tony Barone, Sr. became an assistant coach of the Bradley Braves men's basketball team. He started playing college basketball for his father, then head coach of the Texas A&M Aggies. He earned honorable mention on the All-Big XII team as a sophomore, as well as being named to the Big XII Academic All-Conference team. When his father left A&M to coach in the NBA, Barone transferred to Marquette. After "redshirting" a season under NCAA transfer rules, he played two seasons for Marquette, becoming team captain and a member of the Conference USA All-Academic Team.

Barone earned a bachelor’s in communications from Marquette in 2000 and followed that with a master’s degree in communications from Marquette in 2002.  Barone and his wife, Mimi, have a son, Carson, and three daughters, Ava, Gianna and Cecilia.

Head coaching record

References

External links
 SIU Edwardsville profile

Living people
1979 births
American men's basketball coaches
American men's basketball players
Basketball coaches from Illinois
College men's basketball head coaches in the United States
Basketball players from Illinois
Illinois State Redbirds men's basketball coaches
Marquette Golden Eagles men's basketball players
Indiana Hoosiers men's basketball coaches
Green Bay Phoenix men's basketball coaches
SIU Edwardsville Cougars men's basketball coaches
Guards (basketball)